In mathematics, the Poincaré–Miranda theorem is a generalization of the intermediate value theorem, from a single function in a single dimension, to  functions in  dimensions. It says as follows:

Consider  continuous functions of  variables, . Assume that for each variable , the function  is constantly nonpositive when  and constantly nonnegative when .

The theorem is named after Henri Poincaré, who conjectured it in 1883, and Carlo Miranda, who in 1940 showed that it is equivalent to the Brouwer fixed-point theorem.

Intuitive description

The picture on the right shows an illustration of the Poincaré–Miranda theorem for  functions. The function  is negative on the left boundary and positive on the right boundary (green sides of the square), while the function  is negative on the lower boundary and positive on the upper boundary (red sides of the square).

Generalizations
The simplest generalization, as a matter of fact a corollary, of this theorem is the following one. 
For every variable , let  be any value in the range
.
Then there is a point in the unit cube in which for all : 
.  

This statement can be reduced to the original one by a simple translation of axes,

where
 are the coordinates in the domain of the function
 are the coordinates in the codomain of the function.

Notes

References

.
.

External links

Topology
Real analysis